The 1961 NCAA College Division basketball tournament involved 32 schools playing in a single-elimination tournament to determine the national champion of men's NCAA College Division college basketball as a culmination of the 1960-61 NCAA College Division men's basketball season. It was won by Wittenberg University and South Dakota State's Don Jacobson was the Most Outstanding Player.

Regional participants

Regionals

South – Clarksville, Tennessee
Location: Memorial Health Building Host: Austin Peay State College

Third place – Kentucky Wesleyan 111, Chattanooga 80

East – Reading, Pennsylvania
Location: Bollman Center Host: Albright College

Third place – Virginia Union 70, Fairfield 66

Northeast – Springfield, Massachusetts
Location: Judd Gymnasia Host: Springfield College

Third place – Rochester 82, Springfield 68

Mideast – Crawfordsville, Indiana
Location: Chadwick Court Host: Wabash College

Third place – Youngstown State 96, South Carolina State 82

Great Lakes – Chicago, Illinois
Location: Henry Crown Field House Host: University of Chicago

Third place – Evansville 98, MacMurray 97*

Southwest – Cape Girardeau, Missouri
Location: Houck Field House Host: Southeast Missouri State College

Third place – Trinity 75, Colorado College 58

Midwest – Brookings, South Dakota
Location: The Barn Host: South Dakota State College

Third place – Cornell 83, Wisconsin–Superior 72

Pacific Coast – Santa Barbara, California
Location: Robertson Gymnasium Host: University of California, Santa Barbara

Third place – Chapman 68, Nevada 63

*denotes each overtime played

National finals – Evansville, Indiana
Location: Roberts Municipal Stadium Host: Evansville College

Third place – South Dakota State 77, Mount St. Mary's 76

*denotes each overtime played

All-tournament team
 George Fisher (Wittenberg)
 Don Jacobsen (South Dakota State)
 John O'Reilly (Mount Saint Mary's)
 Vivian Reed (Southeast Missouri State)
 Carl Ritter (Southeast Missouri State)

See also
 1961 NCAA University Division basketball tournament
 1961 NAIA Basketball Tournament

References

Sources
 2010 NCAA Men's Basketball Championship Tournament Records and Statistics: Division II men's basketball Championship
 1961 NCAA College Division Men's Basketball Tournament jonfmorse.com

NCAA Division II men's basketball tournament
Tournament
NCAA College Division basketball tournament
NCAA College Division basketball tournament